Cha. Fra. D'Costa was a Konkani poet, dramatist and journalist.

Early life
Cha. Fra. was born in Mangalore on 10 October 1931 near Marnamikatta as the eldest of four children of Madthabai and Marcel D’Costa. He did his primary education in Cascia School and High School in Milagres School where the medium of instruction was English.
He moved to Bombay in 1948 and worked in the Election Commission for the first general election of independent India. Later he became an employee of B.E.S.T.

Konkani journalism
He was also editor of Poinnari and later, after leaving Poinnari in 1959, Cha. Fra. D'Costa started Konkani periodicals such as Zag-mag, Vixal Konkonn (1961), Jivit (1983), and Udev (1976).

Plays 
 Sobit Sounsar
 Sunnem Mazor Hansta (One-Act)
 Tomato (One-Act)
 Vishenticho Bhav (One-Act)
 Tornem Tornem Mornem (One-Act)
 Poinnaryancho Mitr
 Bhangar Monis
 Jorji Buthel
 Mankddacho Pai
 Magirchem Magir
 Boklaak Sat Ji:v
 Kuvalyachi Val
 Handdo uttla
 Boncho Bandh
 Dev Polleit Asa
 Doro
 Them Tho ani Hanv
 Shirigundi Shimaon
 Dakther Dusman
 Jillacho Novro
 Moja Puthacho Kinkulo
 Rojik Kazar
 Avnkwar Mesthri
 Zuze Dayal
 Macho

Poetry 
 Sonshayche Kan

Awards 
He won the Central Sahitya Akademi Award in 1989.

Citations

References

1931 births
1992 deaths
Konkani people
Writers from Mangalore
Recipients of the Sahitya Akademi Award in Konkani
Konkani-language poets
20th-century Indian poets
Indian male poets
Poets from Karnataka
20th-century Indian male writers